The Communauté de communes Bruyères - Vallons des Vosges is an administrative association of rural communes in the Vosges department of eastern France. It was created on 1 January 2014 by the merger of the former Communauté de communes de l'Arentèle-Durbion-Padozel, Communauté de communes de la Vallée de la Vologne, Communauté de communes du canton de Brouvelieures and three other communes. On 1 January 2018 it lost 3 communes to the Communauté d'agglomération de Saint-Dié-des-Vosges. It consists of 34 communes, and has its administrative offices at Bruyères. Its area is 220.0 km2, and its population was 15,116 in 2019.

Composition
The communauté de communes consists of the following 34 communes:

Beauménil
Belmont-sur-Buttant
Brouvelieures
Bruyères
Champ-le-Duc
Charmois-devant-Bruyères
Cheniménil
Destord
Deycimont
Docelles
Domfaing
Faucompierre
Fays
Fiménil
Fontenay
Fremifontaine
Girecourt-sur-Durbion
Grandvillers
Gugnécourt
Herpelmont
Jussarupt
Laval-sur-Vologne
Laveline-devant-Bruyères
Laveline-du-Houx
Lépanges-sur-Vologne
Méménil
La Neuveville-devant-Lépanges
Nonzeville
Pierrepont-sur-l'Arentèle
Prey
Le Roulier
Vervezelle
Viménil
Xamontarupt

References

Bruyeres - Vallons des Vosges
Bruyeres - Vallons des Vosges